Kitekeh (also Romanized as Kītekeh; also known as Ketekeh) is a village in Kani Bazar Rural District, Khalifan District, Mahabad County, West Azerbaijan Province, Iran. At the 2006 census, its population was 291, in 36 families.

References 

Populated places in Mahabad County